The Kashalot-class submarine (NATO reporting name: Uniform), Soviet designation Project 1910, is a class of research and special operations submarine constructed by the Soviet Union during the late 1970s and early 1980s.

Two boats of the class were constructed, AS-13 and AS-15, with the first boat of the class being laid down in 1977 and commissioned in 1986, the second being laid down in 1983 but not commissioned until 1991. A third class boat, AS-12, reached the fitting-out stage before being cancelled in 1998.

Displacing 1,580 tons submerged, the Kashalot class was constructed using a single titanium hull design, and is powered by a nuclear reactor; they were the first Soviet nuclear-powered submarines to have a single hull. The boats each have a crew of 36 officers and men. AS-13 and AS-15 were reported active as of 2016.


See also
 List of submarine classes in service

References

Citations

Bibliography

External links
 

Russian and Soviet navy submarine classes
Submarines of the Soviet Navy
Research submarines